Mishel Prada (born 1989) is an American actress. She is best known for portraying the lead role of Emma Hernandez on the Starz drama series, Vida. She previously starred in The Walking Dead spinoff web series, Fear the Walking Dead: Passage.

Early life 
Prada was born and raised in Hialeah, a city in the metropolitan Miami area. Through her grandparents, she is of Dominican, Mexican, Puerto Rican, and French descent. Prada's parents immigrated to the United States. She was raised speaking Spanish.

Career 
Prada began acting as a child, performing in church and school productions. She pursued acting professionally when she was 23. While acting in minor roles, she worked as a concierge at the Roosevelt Hotel in Los Angeles.

Her first lead role was in Fear the Walking Dead: Passage, which received a Creative Arts Emmy Award nomination. She introduced herself to Stranger Things casting director Carmen Cuba after the ceremony, and Cuba called Prada later to read for a role in the Starz drama Vida, which was in production.

Prada first auditioned for the roles of Lyn and Cruz, but was eventually offered the role of Emma, a Mexican-American woman who moves back to her gentrifying neighborhood in East Los Angeles after the death of her mother. Vida debuted in May 2018 and the second season premiered on May 23, 2019.

She is a founding member of a female art collective called Damarosa, which looks at the artistic work of influential women in literature.

She portrayed Hermosa Lodge on season four of The CW teen series, Riverdale.

Filmography

Film

Television

References

External links 
Mishel Prada on IMDb
Damarosa—Official website

Living people
21st-century American actresses
Hispanic and Latino American actresses
American television actresses
Actresses from Florida
1989 births
Entertainers from Florida